is a retired Nippon Professional Baseball player. He was formerly with the Osaka Kintetsu Buffaloes. Currently, he was most recently the first team pitching coach of the Chunichi Dragons.

External links

Living people
1970 births
Baseball people from Shizuoka Prefecture
Japanese baseball players
Nippon Professional Baseball pitchers
Kintetsu Buffaloes players
Osaka Kintetsu Buffaloes players
Managers of baseball teams in Japan